Cornwall is a former county constituency covering the county of Cornwall, in the South West of England. It was a constituency of the House of Commons of England then of the House of Commons of Great Britain from 1707 to 1800 and of the House of Commons of the United Kingdom from 1801 to 1832. It was represented by two Knights of the Shire, elected by the bloc vote system.

Under the Reform Act 1832, it was divided between the constituencies of East Cornwall and West Cornwall.

Boundaries and franchise
The constituency consisted of the whole of the historic county of Cornwall, the most south-westerly county of England, occupying the part of the South West peninsula to the west of the River Tamar which divides the county from Devon. (Although Cornwall contained a number of parliamentary boroughs, each of which elected two MPs in their own right, these were not excluded from the county constituency, and owning property within a borough could confer a vote at the county election. For a summary of the boroughs represented before 1832 see Parliamentary representation from Cornwall.)

As in other county constituencies the franchise between 1430 and 1832 was defined by the Forty Shilling Freeholder Act, which gave the right to vote to every man who possessed freehold property within the county valued at £2 or more per year for the purposes of land tax; it was not necessary for the freeholder to occupy his land, nor even in later years to be resident in the county at all.

By the time of the Great Reform Act in 1832, the population of Cornwall was about 300,000. Only a tiny fraction of these were entitled to vote. Sedgwick estimated there were about 2,300 electors in this constituency in the 1715–1754 period, and Namier and Brooke suggest this had increased to about 2,500 electors in the 1754–1790 period. At the vigorously contested election of 1790, when a high turnout can be assumed, 4,656 valid votes were cast (each voter being entitled to vote twice). At Cornwall's final election, in 1831, 5,350 votes were cast.

Members of Parliament
 Constituency created (1290)

1290–1510

1510–1629
As there were sometimes significant gaps between Parliaments held in this period, the dates of first assembly and dissolution are given. Where the name of the member has not yet been ascertained or (before 1558) is not recorded in a surviving document, the entry unknown is entered in the table.

The Roman numerals after some names are those used in The House of Commons 1509–1558 to distinguish a member from another politician of the same name.

In 1529 alternative versions are given of the names for one member. The first comes from the above book on the House of Commons. The second originates from another source.

1640–1832

Representation increased to four seats in Barebones Parliament

Representation increased to eight seats in First and Second Protectorate Parliaments

Representation restored to two seats in Third Protectorate Parliament

Constituency abolished (1832)

Elections

The bloc vote electoral system was used in two seat elections and first past the post for single member by-elections. Each elector had as many votes as there were seats to be filled. Votes had to be cast by a spoken declaration, in public, at the hustings, which were usually held at the county town. The expense and difficulty of voting at only one location in the county, together with the lack of a secret ballot contributed to the corruption and intimidation of electors, which was widespread in the unreformed British political system.

The expense, to candidates and their supporters, of contested elections encouraged the leading families of the county to agree on the candidates to be returned unopposed whenever possible. Contested county elections were therefore unusual.

There were no contested general election polls in Cornwall between 1710 and 1774. Leading Whig politicians, like Sir Robert Walpole, were happy to let Tory squires represent the county; to avoid them interfering with Whig plans in the county's numerous borough constituencies. The related families of Carew, Molesworth, St Aubyn and Buller monopolised the representation for much of the 18th century, until the partners in the Miners' Bank at Truro, Humphrey Mackworth Praed and William Lemon, became involved in elections in the 1770s.

Note on percentage change calculations: Where there was only one candidate of a party in successive elections, for the same number of seats, change is calculated on the party percentage vote. Where there was more than one candidate, in one or both successive elections for the same number of seats, then change is calculated on the individual percentage vote.

Note on sources: The information for the election results given below is taken from Sedgwick 1715–1754, Namier and Brooke 1754–1790 and Stooks Smith 1790–1832.

Elections in the 1710s

Elections in the 1720s

Elections in the 1730s

Elections in the 1740s

 Death of Carew

 Death of St Aubyn

 Death of Carew

Elections in the 1750s

Elections in the 1760s

 Death of Buller

Elections in the 1770s
 Death of St Aubyn

 Death of Molesworth

Elections in the 1780s

 Creation of Eliot as 1st Lord Eliot

Elections in the 1790s

 Note (1790): This was the first election, for this constituency, where Stooks Smith used party labels for candidates.

Elections in the 1800s

Elections in the 1810s

Elections in the 1820s

 Death of Lemon

Elections in the 1830s

 Note (1831): Stooks Smith records that the poll took five days.
 Constituency divided (1832)

See also

List of former United Kingdom Parliament constituencies
Unreformed House of Commons
Parliamentary representation from Cornwall

References

Sources
 D Brunton & D H Pennington, Members of the Long Parliament (London: George Allen & Unwin, 1954)
 Cobbett's Parliamentary history of England, from the Norman Conquest in 1066 to the year 1803 (London: Thomas Hansard, 1808)
 F W S Craig, British Parliamentary Election Results 1832–1885 (2nd edition, Aldershot: Parliamentary Research Services, 1989)
 J E Neale, The Elizabethan House of Commons (London: Jonathan Cape, 1949)
 Historical Parliamentary Papers at British History Online
 The House of Commons 1509–1558, by S.T. Bindoff (Secker & Warburg 1982)
 The House of Commons 1715–1754, by Romney Sedgwick (HMSO 1970)
 The House of Commons 1754–1790, by Sir Lewis Namier and John Brooke (HMSO 1964)
 The Parliaments of England by Henry Stooks Smith (1st edition published in three volumes 1844–50), second edition edited (in one volume) by F.W.S. Craig (Political Reference Publications 1973))

Notes in text

Constituencies of the Parliament of the United Kingdom established in 1290
Constituencies of the Parliament of the United Kingdom disestablished in 1832
Parliamentary constituencies in Cornwall (historic)